The Worldwide Express 250 for Carrier Appreciation is a NASCAR Camping World Truck Series race at Richmond Raceway. The race was  initially held from 1995 to 2005 before being removed from the schedule in 2006. The race returned to the Truck Series schedule 14 years later in 2020. In the race's first stint on the Truck Series schedule, it was 200 laps. When it returned in 2020, the distance was 250 laps.

In 2020, NASCAR removed the spring Truck Series race at Martinsville Speedway in favor of a race at Richmond Raceway in the spring. This schedule change was done in a swap with Martinsville, which previously had two Truck Series races and zero Xfinity Series races and would now have one Truck Series race and one Xfinity Series race. As a result, the Xfinity Series would lose their spring race at Richmond in favor of a race at Martinsville in the fall. In its first year back on the schedule in 2020, the Truck Series race at Richmond would be moved to September due to the COVID-19 pandemic. The race would be held as scheduled in April in 2021. In 2022, the race was moved to August. Worldwide Express would become the title sponsor of the race as Toyota moved their title sponsorship to the track's one Xfinity Series race (replacing GoBowling.com as the title sponsor of that race).

Past winners

1999: Race shortened due to rain.
2004 & 2005: Race extended due to NASCAR overtime.
2020: Race postponed from April 18 to September 10 due to the COVID-19 pandemic.

Multiple winners (drivers)

Multiple winners (teams)

Manufacturer wins

References

External links
 

NASCAR Truck Series races
Recurring sporting events established in 1995
Annual sporting events in the United States
1995 establishments in Virginia